Blepharodon is a genus of plant in the family Apocynaceae, first described as a genus in 1844. They are native primarily to South America, with one species extending into Central America and Mexico.

Species

formerly included
transferred to other genera (Ditassa, Macroditassa, Minaria, Nephradenia)

References

Asclepiadoideae
Apocynaceae genera
Taxa named by Joseph Decaisne